Minamoto no Kanemasa (dates unknown) was a waka poet and Japanese nobleman active in the Heian period. One of his poems is included in the Ogura Hyakunin Isshu. A member of the Minamoto clan, his work is also included in the Kin'yō Wakashū and the Shinsenzai Wakashū.

External links 
E-text of his poems in Japanese

Japanese poets
Minamoto clan
Hyakunin Isshu poets